A Waltz by Strauss may refer to:
 A Waltz by Strauss (1931 film), a German historical musical film
 A Waltz by Strauss (1925 film), an Austrian silent film